Apophthisis pullata is a moth of the family Gracillariidae. It is known from Ohio, United States.

The larvae feed on Rhamnus lanceolata. They mine the leaves of their host plant. The mine is linear at first, but gradually broadens into an irregular blotch, and occupying about a quarter of the leaf area.

References

Gracillariinae